The men's 1500 metres event at the 1990 World Junior Championships in Athletics was held in Plovdiv, Bulgaria, at Deveti Septemvri Stadium on 11 and 12 August.

Medalists

Results

Final
12 August

Heats
11 August

Heat 1

Heat 2

Heat 3

Participation
According to an unofficial count, 40 athletes from 27 countries participated in the event.

References

1500 metres
1500 metres at the World Athletics U20 Championships